The Tuke River is a river of the West Coast Region of New Zealand's South Island. It flows northwest from the Southern Alps, combining with the Dickson River to form the Mikonui River 15 kilometres southeast of Ross.

See also
List of rivers of New Zealand

References

Rivers of the West Coast, New Zealand
Rivers of New Zealand
Westland District